David Andersson (born 23 February 1994) is a Swedish speed skater.

Andersson competed at the 2014 Winter Olympics for Sweden. In the 1000 metres and the 1500 metres he finished 38th overall.

As of September 2014, Andersson's best performance at the World Single Distance Championships is 23rd, in the 2013 1500 metres.

Andersson made his World Cup debut in November 2012. As of September 2014, Andersson's top World Cup finish is 4th in a 1500m B race at Kolomna in 2012–13. His best overall finish in the World Cup is 37th, in the 1500 metres in 2012–13.

References 

1994 births
Swedish male speed skaters
Speed skaters at the 2014 Winter Olympics
Olympic speed skaters of Sweden
People from Vänersborg Municipality
Living people
Sportspeople from Västra Götaland County
21st-century Swedish people